Rogue is a 2017 Indian action thriller film directed by Puri Jagannadh and shot simultaneously in Telugu and Kannada languages. The film introduces Ishan in the lead role, along with Mannara Chopra and Angela Krislinzki playing the female leads.

Filming began in November 2015 and the first trailer was out on 1 March 2017.

Ishan won SIIMA Award for Best Male Debut (Telugu) at 7th SIIMA.

Plot

Cast
 Ishan as Sanju
 Mannara Chopra as Anjali 2
 Angela Krislinzki as Anjali 1
 Thakur Anoop Singh as Psycho
 Ajaz Khan as Ajaz
 Avinash
 Satya Dev as Anjali's brother
 Ali / Sadhu Kokila
 Thulasi Shivamani 
 Subbaraju 
 Chirag Jani as Chirag
 Posani Krishna Murali as Seth

Production
In 2015, after the completion of the film Loafer, Puri Jagannadh announced that he would start his new project titled Rogue to be a sequel of his 2006 blockbuster film, Pokiri and had approached actor Mahesh Babu for the lead role. Since there were no confirmation from the actor's side, Puri hinted at directing Chiranjeevi's 150th film and narrated the story. Since Chiranjeevi was not impressed with the second half of the film and instead preferred a remake of Tamil film Kaththi, Puri went ahead with a fresh concept and cast producer C. R. Manohar's cousin Ishaan in the lead role. On 5 October 2015, Puri announced on his Twitter that he would introduce a new face for his upcoming film titled Rogue. Initially actresses Aisha Sharma and Pooja Jhaveri were signed on for the lead female roles. The shoot began and suddenly was shelved due to various reasons. Later, Puri revived the project by replacing Jhaveri with Angela Krislinzki who had earlier appeared in a song of the film Jyothi Lakshmi to play the lead role along with Mannara Chopra in the parallel lead.

Music

The official soundtrack of the film consisting of six songs was composed by Sunil Kashyap. While the Kannada version of the audio is about to be launched on 9 March 2017 at Bangalore Palace in Bengaluru and invited actors Shiva Rajkumar, Sudeep and Puneeth Rajkumar to be at the event. The Telugu version is planned to release in the second week of March with actor Nandamuri Balakrishna and Sunny Leone being the primary invitees.

Release and Reception 
The First Post gave a disaster review for the film, and The Hindu gave an average review for the film.

References

External links
 Rogue film crew
 

2017 films
Films directed by Puri Jagannadh
2010s Telugu-language films
2010s Kannada-language films
Indian action thriller films
Indian multilingual films
2017 action thriller films
2017 multilingual films